WOWW (1430 kHz) is a commercial AM radio station licensed to Germantown, Tennessee, and serving the Memphis metropolitan area.  WOWW carries a Top 40 (CHR) radio format and calls itself "B97.7".  It is owned and operated by Flinn Broadcasting Corporation.  The studios and offices are in Southaven, Mississippi.

WOWW is powered at 2,500 watts.  At night, to protect other stations on 1430 AM, WOWW uses a directional antenna with a six-tower array.  The transmitter is off Orgill Road in Bartlett, Tennessee.  Programming is also heard on an FM translator:  220 watt W249BN at 97.7 MHz in Memphis.

History

WHER

On October 29, 1955, the station signed on as WHER, a pioneering station with an all-female air staff, including broadcaster Vida Jane Butler. The radio station was the brainchild of Sam Phillips, who used a portion of the $35,000 he made from the sale of Elvis Presley's recording contract to RCA Records to finance the station. A portion of the balance of the funding came from Holiday Inn founder Kemmons Wilson, who also provided the station's first home, in a part of the third Holiday Inn ever built. It aired light music and had the slogan "1,000 Beautiful Watts". The licensee was Tri-State Broadcasting Service, initially owned by Phillips, Clarence A. Camp, and James E. Connolly.

WWEE

In the early 1970s, WHER went to a mixed-gender air staff and became talk station WWEE. The station gave birth to the longest running sports talk show "SportsLine" (now called "SportsTime"). "SportsLine" went on the air in 1972. 
Notable former staff members include Marge Thrasher, Bill Thomas, George Lapides, Dick Palmer, Jim Fields, and Jeff Weinberger.

In 1981, the Phillips family bought out the other owners of Tri-State Broadcasting Service, becoming known as the Big River Broadcasting Corporation. Big River liquidated in 1986, selling WWEE to the Ardman Broadcasting Corporation of Tennessee. In 1989, after seven months spent simulcasting co-owned WEZI (now WLFP with the same call letters, Ardman relaunched the station as WNWZ. Flinn bought the station in 1993, changing the call letters to WOWW in 1997.

Format flips
On February 15, 1997, WOWW flipped from adult standards to Radio AAHS, a children's format. Due to Radio AAHS ceasing operations on January 30, 1998, the station switched to a talk format. After later shifting to an oldies and classical music format, WOWW returned to a children's format with Radio Disney in late March 2000.

On March 12, 2012, WOWW dropped Radio Disney after nearly 12 years in favor of a news format.

On April 10, 2013, WOWW changed their format to country, simulcasting WEBL 95.3 FM.

On June 21, 2013, WUMY dropped its classic country format for variety hits as "97.7 Guess FM".

On January 2, 2014, WOWW began stunting, directing listeners to WUMY 830 AM Memphis, Tennessee, which took over the "Guess FM" variety hits format.

A few days later, WOWW changed their format to country, branded as "The Rebel", simulcasting WEBL 95.3 FM Coldwater, MS.

On August 6, 2018 WOWW changed their format to classic hits, branded as "97.7 Guess FM".

On May 13, 2022 at noon, WOWW changed their format from classic hits to top 40/CHR, branded as "B97.7". This returns the station to playing current Top 40 music on this frequency for the first time since Radio Disney in 2012, which also carried a similar format.

Translator
In addition to the main station, WOWW is relayed by an FM translator to widen its broadcast area.  It also provides the listener with high fidelity/stereophonic sound.

Previous logo

References

External links

WHER
Kitchen Sisters documentary on WHER
"Golden Girls", On the Media, October 28, 2005. '
"Talk on Lost and Found Sound's", Peter Guralnick

OWW
Germantown, Tennessee
Radio stations established in 1955
1955 establishments in Tennessee
Contemporary hit radio stations in the United States